No. 53 Squadron was a Royal Air Force squadron that saw service in both the First and Second World Wars.

History

No. 53 Squadron of the Royal Flying Corps was formed at Catterick on 15 May 1916. Originally intended to be a training squadron, it was sent to France to operate reconnaissance in December that year. The squadron was equipped with the B.E.2e—swapped for the R.E.8 in April 1917. It returned the UK in March 1919 to Old Sarum where it was disbanded on 25 October 1919.

The squadron reformed on 28 June 1937 at RAF Farnborough with the Hawker Hector for Army Cooperation; specialising in night reconnaissance.
The squadron was given the Bristol Blenheim light bomber in January 1939 and moved to France in September. Following the German attack on France in May 1940, the squadron returned to the UK. From here it undertook bombing and reconnaissance missions.

In 1940 it was transferred from RAF Fighter Command to RAF Coastal Command, thereafter alternating between No. 16 Group RAF and No. 19 Group RAF. It moved to RAF St Eval, Cornwall, for anti-submarine and anti-shipping operations. In July 1941 the Blenheims were replaced by the Lockheed Hudson. In July 1942 the squadron was transferred to the Eastern Seaboard of the USA, from there it moved to Trinidad. It returned to Cornwall, RAF Davidstow Moor and was given Armstrong Whitworth Whitleys in early 1943. It moved on to stations in Norfolk but by May was operating the Consolidated Liberators at RAF Thorney Island, Hampshire.

In September 1944 it was transferred to Iceland where it stayed until the end of the war in Europe. It came back to the UK to RAF St Davids, joining RAF Transport Command to carry troops to India. The squadron was disbanded at RAF Gransden Lodge on 15 June 1946.

It was reformed on 1 November 1946 with Douglas Dakotas which it used throughout the Berlin Airlift and was then disbanded again on  31 July 1949.

The squadron reformed the next day at RAF Topcliffe with Handley Page Hastings transports. Blackburn Beverleys replaced the Hastings in 1957. It was disbanded at Abingdon on 28 June 1963.

On 1 November 1965 at RAF Fairford it reformed as the RAF's first and only squadron with the Short Belfast. It moved to RAF Brize Norton in 1967, and remained there until disbanding on 14 September 1976.

See also
List of Royal Air Force aircraft squadrons
1957 Sutton Wick Beverley accident

References

Citations

Bibliography

 Halley, James J. The Squadrons of the Royal Air Force & Commonwealth, 1918–1988. Tonbridge, Kent, UK: Air-Britain (Historians) Ltd., 1988. .
 Manson, Jock. United in Effort: The Story of No.53 Squadron Royal Air Force, 1916–1976. Tunbridge Wells, Kent, UK: Air-Britain (Historians) Ltd., 1997. .
 Rawlings, John D.R. Coastal, Support and Special Squadrons of the RAF and their Aircraft. London: Jane's Publishing Company Ltd., 1982. .
 Sturtivant, Ray I.S.O. and John Hamlin. RAF Flying Training and Support Units since 1912. Staplefield, West Sussex, UK: Air-Britain (Historians) Ltd., 2007. .

External links

No. 53 Squadron Groups and Bases
History of No.'s 51–55 Squadrons at RAF Web
RAF Davidstow Moor

053
053